Nelson Everard Stiffle (1928–2005) was an English football player and coach.

Playing career
Stiffle played 15 times for Ashton United between March and September 1951.  He had been earlier been playing for Chester Reserves in the Cheshire League. In September 1951 he signed for Crystal Palace for £100 transfer fee from Ashton, but by December he had returned to Chester. After seven appearances for Chester's first team he was signed by Altrincham in 1952. He played 72 times for Altrincham before being signed by Chesterfield in March 1954. He stayed at Chesterfield until May 1955, playing 38 times.

He signed for Bournemouth and Boscombe Athletic before the 1955/56 season. In almost three seasons at Bournemouth he played 35 matches. In 2009 The Times ranked him 24th in their Top 50 Bournemouth players list.

In March 1958 he joined Exeter City. He played 94 matches for Exeter before a move to Coventry City in July 1960. After 15 appearances for Coventry he emigrated to Australia where he played several seasons for Bankstown.

Coaching
While still playing himself, Stiffle professionally coached Bankstown First, Second and Third Grade Divisions in the New South Wales State League.

Personal life
Stiffle died in Brisbane on the 8th April 2005 after suffering with a heart condition. He was the first Indian-born player to appear in the Football League.

References

1928 births
2005 deaths
Anglo-Indian people
AFC Bournemouth players
Chester City F.C. players
Altrincham F.C. players
Chesterfield F.C. players
Exeter City F.C. players
Coventry City F.C. players
Association football forwards
English footballers
English emigrants to Australia